Basil Risbridger Davidson  (9 November 1914 – 9 July 2010) was a British journalist and historian who wrote more than 30 books on African history and politics. According to two modern writers, "Davidson, a campaigning journalist whose first of many books on African history and politics appeared in 1956, remains perhaps the single-most effective disseminator of the new field to a popular international audience".

Biography

Early life
Basil Davidson was born in Bristol, United Kingdom on 9 November 1914 and left school at 16 and moved to London. In 1938, he gained a job at the Paris correspondent of The Economist and later as the diplomatic correspondent of The Star. He travelled widely in Italy and Central Europe in the 1930s.

Wartime service
Davidson was recruited by the Secret Intelligence Service (SIS) and MI6, D Section. As part of his Mission, he was sent to Budapest, Hungary in December 1939 under the cover of establishing a news service. In April 1941, with the Nazi invasion, he fled to Belgrade, Yugoslavia. In May, he was captured by Italian forces and was later released as part of a prisoner exchange.

From late 1942 to mid-1943, he was chief of the Special Operations Executive (SOE) Yugoslav Section in Cairo, Egypt, where he was James Klugmann's supervisor. He parachuted into Bosnia on 16 August 1943, and spent the following months serving as a liaison with the Partisans, as he would describe in his 1946 book, Partisan Picture. Davidson moved east into Srem and the Fruška Gora in Yugoslavia. He was nearly captured or killed several times. SOE posted him to Hungarian occupied Bačka to try to organize a rebel movement there, but Davidson found that the conditions were unsuitable and crossed back over the Danube into the Fruška Gora. The Germans encircled the Fruška Gora in June 1944 in a last attempt to liquidate the Partisans there, but Davidson and the others made a narrow escape. After Soviet forces entered into Yugoslavia, Davidson was airlifted out. Davidson had enormous appreciation for the Partisans and the communist leader Josip Broz Tito.

From January 1945 Davidson was liaison officer with partisans in Liguria and Genoa, Italy. He was present for the surrender of the German forces in Genoa on 26–27 April 1945. He finished the war as a lieutenant-colonel and was awarded the Military Cross and was mentioned in despatches on two occasions.

Africa and writing career
Davidson returned to journalism after the war. He was employed initially by The Times in Paris but was widely considered to have communist sympathies after his wartime role as the Cold War began. He left in 1949 and became the secretary of the pressure-group, the Union of Democratic Control (UDC) and began to work for the left-leaning New Statesman. However, the Cold War prevented him from returning to Central Europe and instead Davidson became interested in Africa after being invited to South Africa by trade unionists opposed to Apartheid. He published several articles and books critical of white-rule in South Africa and colonial rule in Africa, passing to the Daily Herald (1954–57) and the Daily Mirror (1959–62).

He began a career as a popular writer. He published five novels and 30 other books, mainly on African history and politics. These consolidated his reputation as one of the leading authorities on Africa in the era of independence. From 1969, Davidson was involved in the Anti-Apartheid Movement and eventually became the movement's vice-president. He was a strong supporter of Pan-Africanism, especially from the 1980s, and was critical of the white-minority government in Rhodesia and of the American-backed União Nacional para a Independência Total de Angola (UNITA) in Angola. He spent long periods in Angola and in Eritrea during its struggle for independence from Ethiopia. In 1984, Davidson produced an eight-part documentary series for Channel 4 entitled Africa.

Although not an academic, Davidson gained a reputation as an authority on African affairs and received a number of honorary positions at universities, including the School of Oriental and African Studies. Davidson also gained honorary degrees from universities in Europe and Africa, as well as a number of civic decorations. In 1976, he won the Medalha Amílcar Cabral. He received honorary degrees from the Open University of Great Britain in 1980, and the University of Edinburgh in 1981. For his film series Africa, he won the Gold Award, from the International Film and Television Festival of New York in 1984. In 2002 he was decorated by the Portuguese president Jorge Sampaio as Grande Oficial da Ordem do Infante D. Henrique.

Selected books
Partisan Picture. Bedford: Bedford Books, 1946
Highway Forty: An incident. London: Frederick Muller, 1949.
Golden Horn (novel), Cape, 1952
African Awakening. London: Cape, 1955
Lost Cities of Africa, Little, Brown and Company, 1959
Old Africa Rediscovered, Gollancz, 1959
Black Mother: The Years of the African Slave Trade. Boston: Little Brown, 1961
African Slave Trade: Precolonial History 1450-1850. Boston: Atlantic-Little Brown, 1961 
The African Past: Chronicles from Antiquity to Modern Times. London: Longmans, 1964
Africa: History of a Continent London: Weidenfeld & Nicolson, 1966
African Kingdoms. Time-Life International (Nederland) N V, 1966  
Africa in History. London: Weidenfeld and Nicolson, 1968. 
The Africans: An Entry to Cultural History. Boston, Mass: Little, Brown, 1969
The African Genius. Boston, Mass: Little, Brown, 1969.  
The Africans, Prentice Hall, 1969
The Liberation of Guine, Penguin, 1969
Black Star: A View of the Life and Times of Kwame Nkrumah, 1973. Praeger, New York, 1974
In the Eye of the Storm: Angola's people, Doubleday, Garden City, N.Y., 1972. 1974
A History of West Africa 1000-1800, Longman, 1977
Let Freedom Come: Africa in Modern History, Little, Brown, Boston, 1978
Scenes From The Anti-Nazi War, Monthly Review Press, 1980
Special Operations Europe: Scenes from the anti-Nazi war. London: Gollancz, 1980. 
No Fist Is Big Enough to Hide the Sky: The Liberation of Guinea-Bissau and Cape Verde, 1963-74, 1981
The Black Man's Burden: Africa and the Curse of the Nation-State, Times Books, New York, 1992
African Civilization Revisited: From Antiquity to Modern Times, Africa World Press, Trenton, N.J., 1991. 1995
West Africa Before the Colonial Era, Longman, 1998

References

Bibliography

Further reading

External links
 Basil Risbridger Davidson (Oral History) at Imperial War Museum
 . Video duration 53 m 20 s,  6 January 2016. Consulted on 29 September 2022. Uploader Ousmane N'diaye. "PART 1 : A very well documented series on African History from way before, during and after Slavery trade and colonial period to contemporary times."

1914 births
2010 deaths
British Army personnel of World War II
Military personnel from Gloucestershire
English Africanists
English historians
English spies
Historians of Africa
Place of death missing
Journalists from Bristol
Recipients of the Military Cross
British Special Operations Executive personnel
Yugoslav Partisans members
English social justice activists
English socialists
Anti-apartheid activists